The Zutphen–Glanerbeek railway (Dutch: Staatslijn D) is a railway line in Gelderland and Overijssel, Netherlands running from Zutphen to the German border at Glanerbrug, passing through Hengelo and Enschede. It is the fourth Staatslijn; "Glanerbeek" is the former name for the Glanerbrug railway station. The line was opened between 1865 and 1868. The section between Enschede and the German border was closed for traffic in 1981, but it was reopened in 2001, although physically disconnected from the Dutch railway network; no Dutch train can enter this stretch and trains coming from Germany can not enter the Dutch network through Enschede.

Stations
The main interchange stations on the Zutphen–Glanerbeek railway are:

Zutphen: to Arnhem, Deventer, Apeldoorn and Winterswijk
Hengelo: to Almelo, Oldenzaal and Berlin
Enschede: to Münster and Dortmund

Train services
The following train services use part of the Zutphen–Glanerbeek railway:
Intercity service Schiphol Airport – Amersfoort – Hengelo – Enschede
Intercity service Den Haag Centraal/Rotterdam Centraal – Utrecht – Amersfoort – Hengelo – Enschede
Local service (Stoptrein) Apeldoorn – Deventer – Almelo – Enschede
Local service (Stoptrein) Nijverdal – Almelo – Enschede
Local service (Stoptrein) Zutphen – Hengelo – Oldenzaal
Local service (Regionalbahn) Enschede – Gronau – Coesfeld – Lünen – Dortmund
Local service (Regionalbahn) Enschede – Gronau – Münster

Railway lines in Gelderland
Railway lines in Overijssel
Railway lines opened in 1865